Kong Nay aka Kong Nai (b. March 15, 1944 in Kampot Province, Cambodia) is a Cambodian musician from Kampot Province in southwestern Cambodia who plays a traditional long-necked fretted plucked lute called chapei dang veng.
Commonly referred to as Master Kong Nay, he is a master of the chrieng chapei genre in which a solo vocalist performs semi-improvised topical material within traditional epics self-accompanied with the chapei.

He is one of relatively few great masters to have survived the Khmer Rouge era, and is known as the "Ray Charles of Cambodia".

He received the 2017 Fukuoka Arts and Culture Prize.

Early life

Kong grew up in a poor family in Daung village, in Kampong Trach district’s Svay Tong Khang Choeung commune, Kampot province. At the age of four, he contracted smallpox resulting in his blindness. Drawn to the sound of the chapei players in his village, he mimicked the sound of the instrument until his father was able to purchase a used instrument. Learning from his great uncle Kong Kith, Kong Nay became proficient quickly. By 18, he was playing professionally and married Tat Chhan.

Post war

After winning a national chapei competition in 1991, the Ministry of Culture gave him a monthly salary of $19 and some land in Phnom Penh's Dey Krahom area, near the White Building in Tonle Bassac.

Declining health

In May 2022, Kong Nay was hospitalised for treatment for high blood pressure, diabetes and lung problems at Kampot provincial hospital. Kong's son, Samphors, is quoted as saying his father may not play the chapei again.

Awards & Recognition
 Gold Grand Cross of Cambodia Cultural Reputation (2007)
 Fukuoka Arts and Culture Prize (2017)

Discography

 Un Barde Cambodgien (Chant Et Luth Chapey), released by Maison Des Cultures Du Monde (2003)
 Mekong Delta Blues as Master Kong Nay with Ouch Savy, Long Tale Recordings (2007)

Other Appearances
 Master Kong Nai, by Kong Nai & DENGUE FEVER from Sleepwalking through the Mekong OST, released on M80 Records (2009)
 3 Songs For Human Rights, by Master Kong Nay with The Cambodian Space Project, released by Bophana Audiovisual Resource Center (2012)
 Time To Rise, by VannDa featuring Kong Nai, released by Baramey Production (2021)

Notable Performances
 2007: WOMAD (World of Music, Arts and Dance), Wiltshire, UK
 2008: WOMAD New Zealand, New Plymouth, New Zealand; WOMADelaide, Adelaide, Australia
 2009: World Chamber Music #4 Kong Nay, Tokyo, Japan
 2013: Season of Cambodia (SOC) Festival, New York, USA
 2015: Geidai 21: Geidai Arts Special 2015－Disability & Arts, Tokyo, Japan

References

External links
 https://www.facebook.com/Kongnairealpage - Official facebook page
 https://web.archive.org/web/20080306032151/http://www.cambodianlivingarts.co.uk/

Cambodian musicians
Living people
1944 births